The 1942 Railway Cup Hurling Championship was the 16th series of the Railway Cup, an annual hurling championship organised by the Gaelic Athletic Association. The championship took place between 15 February and 17 March 1942. It was contested by Connacht, Leinster and Munster.

Leinster entered the championship as the defending champions.

On 17 March 1942, Munster won the Railway Cup after a 4-09 to 4-05 defeat of Leinster in the final at Croke Park, Dublin. It was their 10th Railway Cup title overall and their first since 1940. Christy Ring made his first appearance for Munster in the final and won the first of a record 18 Railway Cup winners' medals.

Leinster's Mossy McDonnell was the Railway Cup's top scorer with 4-06.

Results

Semi-final

Final

Top scorers

Overall

Single game

Sources

 Donegan, Des, The Complete Handbook of Gaelic Games (DBA Publications Limited, 2005).

External links
 Munster Railway Cup-winning teams

Railway Cup Hurling Championship
Railway Cup Hurling Championship